Sophie Hennebert (born 1904, date of death unknown) was a Belgian diver. She competed in the women's 10 metre platform event at the 1924 Summer Olympics.

References

External links
 

1904 births
Year of death missing
Belgian female divers
Olympic divers of Belgium
Divers at the 1924 Summer Olympics
Place of birth missing
20th-century Belgian women